Inești is a village in Telenești District, Moldova.

References

Villages of Telenești District